The ARC Centre of Excellence for the History of Emotions (CHE) is an Australian research centre that undertakes research in the history of emotions. The Centre was established in 2011 with core funding from the Australian Research Council (ARC), the Australian Government's main agency for allocating research funding to academics and researchers in Australian universities. The Centre of Excellence for the History of Emotions uses historical knowledge from medieval and early modern Europe to understand how societies have understood, experienced, expressed and performed emotions in pre-modern Europe, and how this long history impacts on contemporary Australia.

Organisational structure 
The Centre has four programs: Meanings, Change, Performance, and Shaping the Modern. Its membership includes fourteen chief investigators, over 38 full-time postdoctoral fellows, 37 postgraduate students and more than 100 associate investigators at universities around Australia.

The Centre has ten international partner investigators from major institutions in the UK, Europe and Canada: Queen Mary University of London, the University of Southampton and Durham University, Newcastle University  and the University of Bristol (UK); Freie Universität Berlin (Germany), Université de Fribourg (Switzerland) and  Umeå University (Sweden); Université du Québec à Montréal and Western University (Canada). The Centre also has formal links with the Arizona Center for Medieval and Renaissance Studies (USA) and the University of York (UK). CHE hosted over 50 international academic visitors on short-term fellowship schemes, and attracted (and continues to attract) many more to its conferences and collaboratories each year, from postgraduates to professors, and the CHE collaborated on major international events in Germany, Italy, the UK, China, South Africa, the USA and Canada.

The Centre was awarded 24 million in Australian Government funding for the period 2011 to 2018, at the time the largest funding award to the humanities in Australian history. From 2018 it has continued with funding from its node universities.

The Society for the History of Emotions (SHE), described as "an international professional association for scholars interested in emotions as historically and culturally situated phenomena", publishes the journal Emotions: History, Culture, Society.

People

Directors
The following individuals have served as directors of the Centre:

References

Further reading
 Brill website for journal Emotions: History, Culture, Society

External links 
 

University of Melbourne
University of Western Australia
University of Sydney
University of Adelaide
University of Queensland
2011 establishments in Australia
University of New England (Australia)
Australian Catholic University
Macquarie University
Western Sydney University
Research organisations in Australia